Ibrahim Sangaré may refer to:

 Ibrahim Sangaré (French footballer) (born 1994), French footballer
 Ibrahim Sangaré (Ivorian footballer) (born 1997), Ivorian footballer